Tiffany Rose Mulheron (born 18 December 1984) is a Scottish former actress, best known for playing Natalie Osborne on Hollyoaks from July 2003 to November 2004.

Personal life
Mulheron is married to businessman Jonathan Rose; they live in Malibu, California with their twin children. She is the sister of Ashley Mulheron.

Filmography

References

External links

Tiffany Mulheron on Myspace

1984 births
Scottish female models
Scottish film actresses
Living people
Scottish television actresses
Scottish soap opera actresses
Place of birth missing (living people)